The canton of Embrun is an administrative division in southeastern France. It includes the following communes:

Baratier
Châteauroux-les-Alpes
Crévoux
Crots
Embrun
Les Orres
Saint-André-d'Embrun
Saint-Sauveur

Demographics

See also
Cantons of the Hautes-Alpes department

References

Cantons of Hautes-Alpes